The 1989 Miami Redskins football team was an American football team that represented Miami University in the Mid-American Conference (MAC) during the 1989 NCAA Division I-A football season. In its seventh and final season under head coach Tim Rose, the team compiled a 2–8–1 record (2–5–1 against MAC opponents), finished in seventh place in the MAC, and were outscored by all opponents by a combined total of 262 to 122.

The team's statistical leaders included Joe Napoli with 1,988 passing yards, Chris Alexander with 551 rushing yards, and Milt Stegall with 426 receiving yards.

Schedule

Roster

References

Miami
Miami RedHawks football seasons
Miami Redskins football